Baarn is a railway station on the Amsterdam–Zutphen railway and the Den Dolder–Baarn railway  located in Baarn, Netherlands. The station is operated by the Nederlandse Spoorwegen (NS). The station was opened on 10 June 1874.

Baarn station is the station the Dutch royal family use, when arriving/leaving Soestdijk Palace. For this use it has a royal waiting room.

The station has 4 platforms. Platform 1 is joined to the station building. This platform is out of use. Platforms 2 and 3 form an island platform and are for trains to Amersfoort and Amsterdam. Platform 4 is used for trains to/from Utrecht Centraal.

In the early days, the HSM had a railway station, for trains to Amsterdam and Amersfoort, this was on the Oosterspoorweg, and the nearby station Baarn Buurtstation, which was for the train to Utrecht. In 1938 the companies became part of the station NS, however Baarn Buurtstation was not closed until the Stichtse lijn was electrified in 1948. The station was rebuilt, with a platform 4 for the Utrecht train, to prevent delays of Intercitys passing through the station. Since March 2009, platform 1 is no longer used for passenger services.

Train services
The following train services call at Baarn:

Bus services

The station is served by lines 272, 572, 573 and N70.

External links

NS website 
Dutch Public Transport journey planner 

Baarn
Railway stations opened in 1874
Railway stations in Utrecht (province)
Railway stations on the Stichtse lijn